This page provides summaries of the 1997 COSAFA Cup, the first edition of the tournament.

Qualifying round

Final round

Individual scorers
 4 goals
  Adelino
 3 goals
  Johannes Hindjou
  Tico-Tico
  Jones Nkhwazi
 2 goals
  Edward Kangwa
  Mwape Miti
  Frazer Kamwandi
  Lovemore Fazili

External links
 Details of the 1997 COSAFA Cup at RSSSF

Cosafa Cup, 1997
COSAFA Cup
International sports competitions hosted by Zambia